Woolmar is a rural locality in the Somerset Region, Queensland, Australia.

Geography
The Kilcoy Showgrounds are located in Woolmar.The D'Aguilar Highway passes through Woolmar. Kilcoy Creek marks a small section of the eastern boundary. In the west elevated terrain reaches higher than 400 metres above sea level.

History
Woolmar Provisional School  opened on 8 March 1894. On 1 January 1909 it became Woolmar State School. It had temporary closures in 1931 and 1940, closing permanently on 14 April 1941.

References

Further reading

External links 

Suburbs of Somerset Region
Localities in Queensland